Fort Providence is a hamlet in the South Slave Region of the Northwest Territories, Canada. Located west of Great Slave Lake, it has all-weather road connections by way of the Yellowknife Highway (Great Slave Highway) branch off the Mackenzie Highway, and the Deh Cho Bridge opened November 30, 2012, near Fort Providence over the Mackenzie. The bridge replaced the ice bridge and ferry, enabling year-round crossing of the river.

Fort Providence hosts the annual Mackenzie Days celebrations in August each year.

History
Fort Providence was founded in the 1860s as a Catholic mission site. By 1868, the Hudson's Bay Company, which previously has a trading post at Big Island at the source of the MacKenzie River, moved the post to the location of the mission site. From that moment, the settlement was known as Fort Providence. In 1867, the Grey Nuns opened a boarding school and an orphanage in the settlement. Instruction languages were English and French, and most of the nuns originated from Quebec.

Demographics 

In 2016, the majority of its population, 620, were Indigenous people, made up of 590 First Nations, Dene people, and 30 Métis.

First Nations
The Dene of the community are represented by the Deh Gáh Got'ı̨ę First Nation and the Métis by Fort Providence Métis Nation. Both groups belong to the Dehcho First Nations.

Gallery

Climate 
Fort Providence has a continental subarctic climate (Dfc) typical of the Northwest Territories' populated areas. It is marked by a long cold winter season and short, warm summers, that in many ways are warmer than expected for an area so far north. Transition seasons are extremely short, with temperatures rising and falling quickly in respective seasons.

See also
 List of municipalities in the Northwest Territories
Fort Providence Airport
Fort Providence Water Aerodrome

References

External links

Communities in the South Slave Region
Dene communities
Hudson's Bay Company forts
Hamlets in the Northwest Territories
Populated places on the Mackenzie River